Thomas Jackson (16 March 1898 – 1975) was an English footballer who played as a goalkeeper. He made close to 200 competitive appearances for Aston Villa, taking over from Sam Hardy when the veteran English international moved to Nottingham Forest. 

Jackson was generally preferred to rival Cyril Spiers for a first team place and featured on the losing side in the 1924 FA Cup Final, but was eventually replaced by Ben Olney. He served with the Royal Northumberland Fusiliers during World War I and attended Durham University before taking up football full-time; his profession after leaving the game was a schoolteacher.

He was mentioned in season 4 episode 2 of the British television drama series Peaky Blinders.

References

English footballers
1975 deaths
1898 births
Footballers from Newcastle upon Tyne
English Football League players
English schoolteachers
Alumni of Durham University
Association football goalkeepers
Aston Villa F.C. players
Kidderminster Harriers F.C. players
British Army personnel of World War I
Royal Northumberland Fusiliers soldiers
FA Cup Final players
Military personnel from Newcastle upon Tyne